Antonia Ružić was the defending champion but chose not to participate.

Rebeka Masarova won the title, defeating Ysaline Bonaventure in the final, 6–4, 6–3.

Seeds

Draw

Finals

Top half

Bottom half

References

External links
Main Draw

Hamburg Ladies and Gents Cup - Singles